Natalia Sergeyevna Golomidova (born 8 June 1995) is a Russian judoka.

She participated at the 2018 World Judo Championships, winning a medal.

References

External links
 
 

1995 births
Living people
Russian female judoka
Universiade silver medalists for Russia
Universiade bronze medalists for Russia
Universiade medalists in judo
Medalists at the 2017 Summer Universiade
Medalists at the 2019 Summer Universiade
21st-century Russian women